Woodlands may back refer to:

 Woodland, a low-density forest

Geography

Australia
 Woodlands, New South Wales
 Woodlands, Ashgrove, Queensland, a heritage-listed house associated with John Henry Pepper
 Woodlands, Marburg, Queensland, a heritage-listed house associated with Thomas Lorimer Smith
 Woodlands, Western Australia
 Woodlands, East Maitland, New South Wales, a heritage-listed residence 
 Woodlands, Newcastle, New South Wales, a heritage-listed house

Canada
 Woodlands, Calgary, a neighbourhood in Alberta, Canada
 Woodlands County, a municipal district in Alberta, Canada
 Woodlands, North Vancouver
 Woodlands, Ontario
 Woodlands, Manitoba
 Woodlands (New Westminster), a former psychiatric hospital in British Columbia
 Rural Municipality of Woodlands, a rural municipality in Manitoba

Singapore
 Woodlands, Singapore
 Woodlands MRT station
 Woodlands North MRT station
 Woodlands South MRT station
 Woodlands Bus Interchange
 Woodlands Train Checkpoint
 Woodlands Checkpoint

United Kingdom
Woodlands, Dorset, England
Woodlands, Falkirk, Scotland
Woodlands, Glasgow, Scotland
Woodlands, Hampshire, England
Woodlands, London, England
Woodlands, Somerset, England
Woodlands, South Yorkshire, England
Woodlands, several other United Kingdom locations
Woodlands, Alexander Drive, Douglas, Isle of Man, one of Isle of Man's Registered Buildings

United States
 Woodlands (Gosport, Alabama)
 Woodlands, California, a census-designated place
 Barnsley Gardens, a plantation formerly known as Woodlands in Adairsville, Georgia
 Woodlands and Blythewood, Clarkesville, Georgia, a National Register of Historic Places listing in Habersham County, Georgia
 Woodlands Historic District, Lexington, Kentucky, a National Register of Historic Places listing in Fayette County, Kentucky
 Woodlands (Perryville, Maryland)
 The Woodlands (Philadelphia, Pennsylvania), a historic mansion and cemetery
 Woodlands (Bamberg, South Carolina)
 Woodlands (Columbia, South Carolina), a National Register of Historic Places listing in Richland County, South Carolina
 The Woodlands, Texas
 Woodlands (Charlottesville, Virginia), a National Register of Historic Places listing in Albemarle County, Virginia
Woodlands, West Virginia

Elsewhere
 Woodlands, Gauteng, South Africa
 Woodlands, New Zealand

Other uses
 Woodlands Christian Centre
 Woodlands Historic Park near Melbourne Airport
 Woodland period, indigenous cultures from ca. 1000 BCE—1000 CE in the eastern part of North America

See also

 Eastern Woodlands, a cultural area of indigenous North Americans
Woodland (disambiguation)
 The Woodlands (disambiguation)
 Woodlands School (disambiguation)